Minit is an adventure video game developed by Jan Willem Nijman, co-founder and one-half of Vlambeer; Kitty Calis, who contributed to Horizon Zero Dawn; Jukio Kallio, a freelance composer; and Dominik Johann, art director of Crows Crows Crows. The game is published by Devolver Digital and was released on April 3, 2018 for Windows, macOS, Linux, Xbox One, and PlayStation 4. On May 11, 2018, a Nintendo Switch version was announced on the first episode of Indie World, a web series from Nintendo of Japan that showcases indie games coming to the Japanese Nintendo eShop. It was released for the Nintendo Switch August 9, 2018. It also came out for mobile devices in June 2019. The game's premise is that each of the player's lives only lasts for one minute, resulting in "a peculiar little adventure played sixty seconds at a time". With each interval, the player will learn more about the environment. A demo for the game was presented at E3 2017.

Plot
The game begins with the player, a duck-like creature, at their house. The player will discover a sword washed up on the shore. Upon picking it up, it is revealed by a now active timer that the sword is cursed. Every 60 seconds the player will die and wake up back in bed. It is revealed by a recurring mailman that the sword is a product of the sword factory, this isn’t the first time this has happened, and to go there as soon as possible. The player is required to go through the seaside, the desert, and the swamp to collect the necessary items needed to be able to reach the factory. 

Upon arriving, the customer service line is full, but if the player found the camera (the press pass in the Switch Version), they are allowed access to the factory. Working with the factory’s overworked employees, the player manages to reverse the production of the swords and upgrade their sword in the process. Through quick dialogue, it is revealed the owner of the factory’s plan was finally working, and they would do everything all over again. However, the player can stop them by hitting the overloading main machine three times. Unfortunately, the explosion turns the owner into a sword-like hybrid and the player has to defeat it. Upon its defeat, the sword will finally break, breaking the curse in the process (indicated by a now-stopped timer). With the sword now completely useless, the player flushes the broken sword down the toilet in the now destroyed factory and returns home to get some rest.

In the second run, the player encounters the broken sword and re-activates the curse, but now the player is limited to one hit point, has less range, and the time limit is now 40 seconds (possibly due to the sword being broken). Upon doing everything again, the player flushes the sword once again, this time for good.

In a post-credits scene, the player is relaxing on a remote island until almost all of the characters encountered suddenly appear.

Gameplay
The gameplay of Minit consists of sixty-second lives in which the player attempts to uncover mysteries and lift a curse. Gameplay progresses by the player keeping all items they have collected during each of their sixty-second lives. Where they respawn depends on their last save point, one for every location excluding the factory. The combat is a simple stab in the direction of movement, but extra abilities can be unlocked by certain items (the Gardening Glove allows the player to break trees).

The game consists of three modes. Normal mode has the standard rules and the 60-second timer. Second Run can be played after Normal mode with added difficulties, restrictions, and a 40-second timer. An unlockable mode is Mary's Mode, where the player has no time limit and the music doesn't seem to play.

Spin-off
In 2021, Devolver Digital launched a new Minit game, Minit Fun Racer, which is available on Steam and proceeds of which will always go to an unspecified charitable efforts. Minit Fun Racer is a iteration of the original game, as the player drives a motorcycle in a 10-second round, with the time increasing by collecting coins.

Reception

Minit received "generally favorable" reviews for Microsoft Windows, PlayStation 4, Xbox One, and Nintendo Switch, according to review aggregator Metacritic.

Accolades

See also
The Legend of Zelda: Majora's Mask, another game that features specific in-game times
Half-Minute Hero, another game in which you have a short, definite timespan to accomplish tasks and advance the story

References

External links
 

2018 video games
Adventure games
Android (operating system) games
Devolver Digital games
GameMaker Studio games
Indie video games
IOS games
Linux games
MacOS games
Monochrome video games
Nintendo Switch games
PlayStation 4 games
Single-player video games
Video games about time loops
Video games developed in the Netherlands
Video games scored by Jukio Kallio
Windows games
Xbox One games